This is a list of notable New York hardcore bands.

Early bands (early to mid-1980s)

Agnostic Front
Adrenalin O.D. (this band is from New Jersey)
Antidote
Beastie Boys
Carnivore
Cro-Mags
Crumbsuckers
Damage
Even Worse
Heart Attack
The Icemen
Kraut
Leeway
Ludichrist
The Mad
Misfits (this band is from New Jersey)
Murphy's Law
Nausea
Reagan Youth
Sheer Terror
Sick of It All
Six and Violence
The Stimulators (not hc, but important transitional band from the old scene.)
Stormtroopers of Death (S.O.D.)
Straight Ahead
The Undead
Urban Waste
Warzone
The Young and the Useless

Late-1980s to early-1990s bands

Biohazard
Bold (aka Crippled Youth)
Born Against
Breakdown
Burn
Candiria
The Casualties
Choking Victim
Earth Crisis
Gorilla Biscuits
Helmet
Into Another
Judge
Killing Time
Life of Agony
Life's Blood
Madball
Merauder
Method of Destruction (M.O.D.)
Orange 9mm
Pro-Pain
Project X
Quicksand
Shelter
Subzero
Unsane

Mid-1990s to 2000s bands

25 ta Life
108
All Out War
The Austerity Program
Awkward Thought
Battle of Mice
Bulldoze
Castevet
Cerebral Ballzy
CIV
Crown of Thornz
Full Blown Chaos
Gay for Johnny Depp
H2O
Indecision
Jets to Brazil
Leftöver Crack
Morning Glory
Most Precious Blood
No Redeeming Social Value
On The Rise
Off Minor
Rival Schools
Saetia
Skarhead
Star Fucking Hipsters
Sworn Enemy
Tragic Figure
Tripface
Fahrenheit 451
District 9
Sons of Abraham
United Nations

Long Island bands

Backtrack
Crime in Stereo
Glassjaw
Half-Man
Incendiary
Invade
Kill Your Idols
Neglect
On The Rise
1.6 Band
Putdown
Scapegrace
Stray from the Path
This Is Hell
Tripface
Vision of Disorder

See also 
List of hardcore punk bands
New York Thrash Compilation documenting the earliest NYHC scene.

Music of New York City
Metalcore musical groups from New York (state)
Hardcore punk groups from New York (state)